Grude is a town in West Herzegovina Canton, Bosnia and Herzegovina.

Grude may also refer to:

Grude (Hadžići), a village in the municipality of Hadžići, Bosnia and Herzegovina
Grudë, Albania
Radio Grude, a Hercegovina commercial radio station